Testis-specific Y-encoded-like protein 1 is a protein that in humans is encoded by the TSPYL1 gene.

References

Further reading